The first series of On the Buses originally aired between 28 February 1969 and 11 April 1969, beginning with "The Early Shift". The series was produced and directed by Stuart Allen. The designer for the first three episodes was David Catley, and Andrew Gardner for the rest of the episodes. All the episodes in this series were written by Ronald Chesney and Ronald Wolfe.

Development

Origin of On the Buses
Chesney and Wolfe were looking for a new idea for a sitcom in the late 1960s. They knew that Reg Varney would be the leading actor because of his previous work on The Rag Trade for the BBC with them. Chesney and Wolfe wanted a combination of The Rag Trade and Meet the Wife, with life at work and at home. They decided that a bus depot setting was the best idea, together with a home setting.

Production
Chesney and Wolfe took their plans to the BBC, who had previously commissioned several of their works. The head of comedy at the BBC, Michael Mills, rejected the project. Less than a week after the BBC's decision, they took it to London Weekend Television (LWT). Frank Muir, a friend of theirs and the head of light entertainment at LWT, accepted the sitcom. Frank Muir suggested Stuart Allen as producer, who had just finished All Gas and Gaiters.

For the character of Stan Butler, Reg Varney was first choice but on a list given to Frank Muir of possible actors, he was second on the list. Ronnie Barker was first and Bernard Cribbins third. They knew that executives usually went for the second choice because it felt safer. For Inspector Blake, Dudley Foster was their first choice but they were unsuccessful in getting him. Both Stephen Lewis and Bob Grant were found by Stuart Allen, who were to play Inspector Blake and Jack Harper respectively. They both came from Mrs Wilson's Diary, a television version of the play  directed by Allen. Lewis and Grant had previously written and acted together. Wolfe found the actor for Arthur Rudge easily; he saw Michael Robbins as a bus passenger on television in The Harry Worth Show. In the same week, Robbins was sent another offer for The Dustbinmen which he declined.

The last two members to be cast were Mabel "Mum" Butler and Olive Rudge. Allen wanted Cicely Courtneidge as Mum and she was given the part for just the first series because she had a theatre production in the West End. Doris Hare was chosen to play Mum from the second series. Anna Karen, who played Olive Rudge, was found accidentally. When Karen turned up to rehearsals for Wild, Wild Women, she looked horrible because she had the flu and Chesney told Wolfe that she could be Olive.

Filming
London Transport refused to allow their buses to be used because they thought it would give them a bad reputation. Eastern National Omnibus Company supplied all the buses used in the On the Buses series. Their main bus depot in Wood Green was used for filming too. The depot's exterior was changed for the series, with it appearing to be called the Luxton Bus Company. Reg Varney went to Eastern National's Basildon depot several times for experience and to take his driving test as a bus driver. Varney could legally drive the bus, but couldn't take passengers with him.

Cast
 Reg Varney as Stan Butler
 Bob Grant as Jack Harper
 Anna Karen as Olive Rudge
 Cicely Courtneidge as Mabel "Mum" Butler
 Stephen Lewis as Inspector Cyril "Blakey" Blake
 Michael Robbins as Arthur Rudge

Episodes

{|class="wikitable plainrowheaders" style="width:100%; margin:auto;"
|-
! scope="col" style="background:#ffe699;" | Episode No.
! scope="col" style="background:#ffe699;" | Series No.
! scope="col" style="background:#ffe699;" | Title
! scope="col" style="background:#ffe699;" | Directed by
! scope="col" style="background:#ffe699;" | Written by
! scope="col" style="background:#ffe699;" | Original air date

|}

See also
 1969 in British television

References

Bibliography

External links
Series 1 at the Internet Movie Database

On the Buses
1969 British television seasons